Diane Francis Christine Felix (born March 15, 1953), also known as Chili D, is an American disc jockey and LGBT activist. She is a third-generation Chicana from Stockton, California.

Early life 
Felix was born in Stockton, California on March 15, 1953. Her mother was from Fresno, California and her father was from Texas. Her parents were second-generation Chicanos from farm-working families. She attended San Joaquin Delta College in Stockton, where she learned to DJ. She worked at Intel while at San Jose University in San Jose. She later started her own business, Felix Computers, building computers at home while in San Francisco.

Activism 
Diane Felix attributes her passion for activism to the various events that she experienced including the murder of the Chicano journalist, Ruben Salazar, by police during the National Chicano Moratorium March  against the Vietnam War.

United Farm Workers (UFW) 
Felix became involved with the United Farm Workers (UFW) after Cesar Chavez gave a talk at her high school. She helped organize the grape boycott in San Francisco and Los Angeles.

Gay Latina/Latino Alliance (GALA) 
In 1975, the Gay Latina/Latino Alliance (GALA) was officially formed. The organization meant to tackle the racism present in the LGBT community, demand political change, and provide a community for gay Latinos. They partook in and coordinated an assortment of events, including a march against Anastasio Somoza García, the 73rd and 76th Nicaraguan president as well as various dance parties.

Felix first became interested in the group that was to become the Gay Latina/Latino Alliance after reading an ad in the Bay Area Reporter. The ad called for a meeting between gay Latinos who were interested in political organizing. Her trip to San Francisco to attend the second general meeting of the group resulted in her permanent relocation to San Francisco from San Jose. She became one of the three lesbians in the group, alongside Alí Marerro and Matú Feliciano, and played a large role in the development of the group. She formed a Women's Caucus and proposed the official name change from Gay Latino Alliance to Gay Latina/Latino Alliance.

However, despite her efforts to address the misogyny in the group, the sexism only escalated when two GALA members, Anthony Lopez and Manuel Quijano, sold their house to buy a bar. The bar, Esta Noche, served to further marginalize queer women in queer spaces. In an interview with Horacio Roque Ramírez, Diane Felix revealed,   Because he [the owner] had hired women bartenders, and we would have meetings and we would tell them, there's a lot of straight Latino men coming in and they're harassing the women, they're harassing the lesbians. [He'd say,] "Well, this isn't a political organization, we don't want to hear that anymore, this is a business, this is a bar."The group eventually disbanded due to internal issues, including sexism.

Community United in Response to AIDS/SIDA (CURAS) 
In 1983, Felix co-founded the Community United in Response to AIDS/SIDA (CURAS). It was the first grassroots Latino community response to the AIDS outbreak in San Francisco. She began as a volunteer, but later became office manager for the group. She later moved into a new position, working as an outreach member for the project. Later, she transitioned into the role of the coordinator of outreach. She was a health educator for the organization before it lost its funding and finally dissolved in 1992.

She also created the program Curanderas, which was later renamed to Mujeres Unidas and Activistas, to address health education and provide health services to immigrant women in the Mission District in San Francisco.

Proyecto ContraSIDA Por Vida (PCPV) 
In 1993, Felix co-founded Proyecto ContraSIDA Por Vida (PCPV), a community-based organization dedicated to providing sex-positive health education to queer communities. While there, she held various positions, such as Program Director, Coordinator of Women's Programs, and Coordinator of LYBRES.

Felix coordinated various projects while at the agency to address Latina lesbian and bisexual health, including the project Lesbianas y Bisexuales Respondiendo con Educación Sexual (LYBRES). LYBRES passed out contraceptives at bars to promote safe sex and also held workshops and discussion for women. Another project she oversaw was the educational performance group called ¡Sinvergüenza! The group performed skits about their experiences, sexual health, and other relevant topics the last Saturday of every month at Felix's club, Colors.

Proyecto ContraSIDA Por Vida stopped serving the community in August 2005.

Art

Media mixing 
Diane first began DJing in the early 1970s while at San Joaquin Delta College in Stockton. She was able to secure a position with a Chicano Station, KUOP as a DJ. She has played on the Latin Stage of the San Francisco Gay and Lesbian Parade for seven years. She has also played at Circus and The Arena in Los Angeles, California.

Theatre 
In 1971, she wrote two of the three plays selected for a theatrical series at San Joaquin Delta College. The first play which was titled, La Macha, is about a high school Chicana grappling with the misogyny she faces at home from her family. After deciding she is fed up with it all, she has a dream about a world in which gender roles are reversed. She dreams of herself coming home from work in a suit to her homemaking husband. The second play was a romance about two star-crossed lovers. One of the characters is the son of a farm owner and the other character is a Chicana protesting the labor conditions existing at the farm with the United Farm Workers. They are unable to be open about their interests in each other because of their roles so they sneak around and only communicate publicly via exchanges of glances and material possessions.

She was first involved with El Teatro Campesino in Juan Bautista, but later joined Teatro de la Gente when she moved to San Jose. She talks about her relationship with Teatro de la Gente in her interview with Osa de La Riva,
I joined Teatro de la Gentre in San Jose. But because I was a dyke, they did not want me in the group. And they gave me a lot of bullshit and put me through a lot of unnecessary drama. So I walked away. 
She became involved in theatre again at a city college.

DJ & club promotion 
Diane Felix began to DJ at A Little More on Potrero Hill, a predominantly Filipina club, in 1976. This club had its own softball team called Un Poquito Mas, composed of Women of Color. In an attempt to create spaces for queer women of color,  she hosted the first club night for queer Latina women in the Mission District in 1986 and called it, "Colors." It closed in 2000. Since arriving in San Francisco, she has been a pivotal person in producing, hosting, and promoting queer Latino-themed club nights in the Bay Area including: Cream (at Space 550) and Kandy in the Castro, Octopussy in San Jose; the dance parties, "Delicious" at The Cafe in San Francisco, and Pan Dulce, an all-gender queer Latino dance party.

Honors and distinctions 
In 2000, Felix was awarded the Local Hero Award as a part of San Francisco's Lesbian and Gay Pride Month commemoration.

In 2000, she was also recognized for her work with Proyecto ContraSIDA Por Vida in the Gay, Lesbian, Bisexual, Transgender Historical Society of Northern California's 15th anniversary celebration.

In 2013, Felix was selected by board members of The San Francisco Pride Celebration Committee to serve as a grand marshall for the event.

See also 
 Hank M. Tavera
 Proyecto ContraSIDA por Vida

References 

1953 births
People from Stockton, California
Living people
American LGBT rights activists
American people of Mexican descent
Activists for Hispanic and Latino American civil rights
LGBT Hispanic and Latino American people
Activists from California
21st-century LGBT people